The Dizzy Gillespie Big 7 (also released as Dizzy) is a live album by Dizzy Gillespie recorded at the  Montreux Jazz Festival in 1975 and released on the Pablo label.

Reception
The Allmusic review called the album " good but not great set... There are many moments that elicit grins of pleasure, but none that cause jaws to gape with astonishment".

Track listing
 "Lover, Come Back to Me" (Oscar Hammerstein II, Sigmund Romberg) - 16:43 
 "I'll Remember April" (Gene de Paul, Patricia Johnston, Don Raye) - 16:02 Bonus track on CD reissue
 "What's New?" (Johnny Burke, Bob Haggart) - 12:13 
 "Cherokee" (Ray Noble) - 11:01

Personnel
Dizzy Gillespie - trumpet
Eddie "Lockjaw" Davis, Johnny Griffin - tenor saxophone
Milt Jackson - vibraphone
Tommy Flanagan - piano
Niels-Henning Ørsted Pedersen - bass
Mickey Roker - drums

References 

Pablo Records live albums
Dizzy Gillespie live albums
Albums produced by Norman Granz
1975 live albums
Albums recorded at the Montreux Jazz Festival